The Kapenguria Museum is a museum located in Kapenguria, Kenya. The museum is located inside the prison where prominent leaders of the Kenyan independence movement (the Kapenguria Six: Jomo Kenyatta, Kungu Karumba, Fred Kubai, Paul Ngei, Bildad Kaggia and Ramogi Achieng Oneko) were held and put on trial in 1952/3. The museum features galleries in the former cells of the prison, including displays on these leaders and the struggle against colonialism, and houses a memorial library in their honour.

The museum also features ethnographic galleries about the Pokot people.

It was opened as a museum in 1993.

References

See also 
 List of museums in Kenya

West Pokot County
Museums in Kenya
Museums established in 1993
Prison museums in Africa
British Kenya
Buildings and structures in Rift Valley Province
Tourist attractions in Rift Valley Province
1993 establishments in Kenya